The Wyss Center is a not-for-profit neurotechnology research foundation in Geneva, Switzerland.

The Center was founded by Hansjörg Wyss, who previously created the Wyss Institute for Biologically Inspired Engineering in the United States. The founding director of the Wyss Center was neuroscientist Professor John P. Donoghue, who is best known for his work on human brain computer interfaces, brain function and plasticity. The mission  of the Wyss Center is to advance understanding of the brain to realize therapies and improve lives.

The Center is based at Campus Biotech (in the former Merck Serono building) located in Geneva, Switzerland. The Director of the Wyss Center is  Mary Tolikas,  who assumed responsibility on 1 June 2019. She was previously a member of the leadership team at the Wyss Institute for Biologically Inspired Engineering at Harvard University during its launching and growth.

The Wyss Center works in the areas of neurobiology, neuroimaging and neurotechnology  to develop clinical solutions from neuroscience research.

See also 
 Campus Biotech
 Wyss Institute for Biologically Inspired Engineering

Notes and references

External links
 Official website
 Campus Biotech

Engineering research institutes
Biotechnology in Switzerland
Laboratories in Switzerland
Research institutes in Switzerland
Multidisciplinary research institutes
Neuroscience research centers in Switzerland